Enrico Gasparri S.T.D. JUD (25 July 1871 – 20 May 1946) was a Roman Catholic Cardinal and Archbishop.

Biography
Enrico was ordained on 10 August 1894 at the age of 23. He studied in Rome receiving degrees in theology and philosophy and worked in Rome in a pastoral role from 1894 until 1898. 

He joined the diplomatic service of the Holy See and was working as the auditor in the nunciature to Brazil when, on 14 November 1915, Pope Benedict XV appointed him Titular Archbishop of Sebastea and Apostolic Delegate to Colombia. 

On 1 September 1920 Pope Benedict appointed him Nuncio to Brazil.

The appointment ended when on 14 December 1925 he was created Cardinal-Priest of San Bartolomeo all'Isola at the age of 54. His creation was an exception made to the 1917 Code of Canon Law that forbade anyone having a relative in the Sacred College of Cardinals.

On the 18 May 1933 Pope Pius XI appointed him Prefect of the  Apostolic Signatura. On the 16 October 1933 he was elevated to Cardinal-Bishop of Velletri. He was one of the cardinal electors in the 1939 papal conclave, which selected Pope Pius XII.

He died on 20 May 1946 at the age of 74.

He was the nephew of Cardinal Secretary of State Pietro Gasparri (1852-1934).

References

20th-century Italian Roman Catholic titular archbishops
20th-century Italian cardinals
Apostolic Nuncios to Colombia
Apostolic Nuncios to Brazil
1871 births
1946 deaths
Prefects of the Apostolic Signatura
Pontifical Roman Seminary alumni